Wilson History and Research Center (WHRC) was a non-profit 501C3 charitable foundation that housed a private collection of twentieth century military headgear and other militaria in Little Rock, Arkansas. Robert M. Wilson, Jr. founded the WHRC in 2008. The collection was researched and presented online through the WHRC's website. The site contained over three thousand individual items. Its goal was to provide a catalog of every piece of military headgear from the twentieth century.

Highlights
The WHRC features the largest collection of military headgear in the world, according to the Book of Alternative Records. In addition to its collection, the WHRC has an exhibit design department that has created and displayed several exhibits in the local area, listed in detail below. Their website also provides a number of articles written by premier collectors of militaria, giving insight into the world of military headgear. Finally, the WHRC has published Exotische: Rare Cloth Headgear of the Third Reich and is currently working on future volumes as well as other books.

Archives
The WHRC collection features headgear from nearly every era of the twentieth century but especially focuses on World War I and World War II. The oldest piece in the collection is dated to the early 19th century, with the latest pieces coming from the War in Afghanistan and Iraq. A large number of countries are represented, including Kazakhstan, North Korea, and Andorra. Both military and some civilian headgear are represented, along with other items such as equipment, uniforms, flags, period photographs and personal items. While not every item in the collection is published on the website, the WHRC continues to update the site daily.

The WHRC held several items of great historical significance and rarity. They were often featured on the front page of their website. These items included: 
 French Cavalry Helmet of General Victor d'Urbal
 Imperial German Army Detachment Gaede Steel Helmet
 U.S. Experimental Model 7 "Sentinel" Helmet
 Bronze Cast of Marshal Paul von Hindenburg's Right Hand Holding Marshals Baton
 U.S. M1 Steel Helmet belonging to General William M. Hoge
 U.S. Air Force Visor Hat of Chief of Staff General Lew Allen, Jr.
 U.S. Army Dress Visor Hat of General Omar Bradley
 U.S. Navy Dress Bicorne Hat of Admiral John Sidney McCain, Sr.
 Capt. Albert Sammt's Visor Hat of the Deutsche Zeppelin-Reederei
 Grappling Hook used by U.S. Army Rangers at Point du Hoc
 German Kriegsmarine Visor Cap of U-Boat Captain Heinrich Lehmann-Willenbrock
 German M-42 Helmet with Embedded Mortar Fin

Exhibitions
The WHRC has created multiple exhibits for various places around Little Rock. An exhibit on the peace talks that ended World War I and World War II and exhibits on the German Freikorps of the early 1920s were both on display at the MacArthur Museum of Arkansas Military History. An exhibit on the Third Reich criminal court, titled Law in a Land Without Justice, was placed on display at the William H. Bowen School of Law.

Related writings
 Exotische: Rare Cloth Headgear of the Third Reich. Privately Published 2010. 
 The American: the Life, Times, and War of Basil Antonelli. Future publication

References

External links 
 militaryheadgear.com
 Basil Blog

Military and war museums in Arkansas
Museums in Little Rock, Arkansas
Non-profit organizations based in Arkansas
2008 establishments in Arkansas